The Air Forces Northern National Security Emergency Preparedness Directorate (AFNSEP or NSEP),  of the First Air Force (1AF or AFNORTH) operates out of its Northern Headquarters at Tyndall Air Force Base, Florida, effective 1 January 2008.

NSEP facilitates and coordinates USAF Defense Support to Civil Authorities (DSCA) for natural and man-made disasters and or emergencies.  The Directorate advises and consults with Office of the Secretary of Defense, Unified Combatant Command, Joint Staff Director of Military Support (JDOMS), and all levels of civil and military authorities on DSCA issues.  Provides Air Force with specific leadership for critical situational awareness between the commands and the field.

Mission
AFNSEP in close collaboration with interagency and allied partners, anticipates and when
directed conducts Homeland Defense and Civil Support operations to defend, protect, and secure the United States and its interests.

For 2011, AFNORTH and AFNSEP focus is on air sovereignty alert mission and Operation Noble Eagle, the command's response to the 9/11 attacks, which aim to protect the country from another aerial attack.

History
AFNSEP was originally began as Air Force National Security Emergency Preparedness Agency, but changed its name when it was deactivated as an Air Staff Field Operating Agency to Air Forces Northern National Security Emergency Preparedness Directorate. This realignment occurred under the United States Northern Command, 1 October 2006.  The first commander of AF Northern HQ was Maj. Gen. Henry C. Morrow, AFNORTH Commander, until November, 2009.

2007 California fires
While USAF local airmen were helping in the battle of deadly blazes consuming
hundreds of acres of Southern California, AFNSEP/AFNORTH sent an Air Component Coordination Element, or ACCE, to the region to support firefighting operations. AFNSEP's eight-person ACCE team coordinated all Air Force, Air National Guard and Air Force Reserve units helping with firefighting efforts. AFNSEP also dispatched six C-130 Hercules aircraft which dumped over 3,000 gallons of fire retardant on blazes, to help with the firefighting effort. (Reported by Maj. Gen. Hank Morrow, AFNORTH Cmdr.)

Background
The AFNSEP program was originally developed due to President Ronald Reagan's 1988 Executive Order 12656. This order identified a need to expand the military's role beyond defense to responding to national emergencies and supporting civilian needs in natural disasters.

Since their formation, AFNSEP has supported more than 125 major disasters, including the 1989 Exxon Valdez Oil Spill, several California wildfires, the Space Shuttle Columbia disaster, several hurricanes to include Andrew and Katrina, and typhoon relief across the United States and the Pacific region.

After Hurricane Katrina, AFNSEP was re-aligned to, according to an order issued by the Secretary of the Air Force,  more closely support civilian authorities during times of national emergencies and disasters by allowing more contiguous command, control and support from US Air Force forces.

Operations
The role of AFNSEP is to train and deploy Emergency Preparedness Liaison Officers (EPLO). EPLOs are normally senior Air Force Reserve Individual Mobilization Augmentee (IMA) officers, who coordinate military assistance to federal agencies and state government when homeland support is requested.

NASA support
AFNORTH provided the manpower for U.S. Northern Command's Joint Task Force-Space Transportation System, responsible for the search and rescue of NASA astronauts and recovery of or crisis response of the Space Shuttle.

References

1AF (AFNORTH) National Security Emergency Preparedness (NSEP) Directorate

External links
AFMORTH Flight Plan 2012 
FAS.org: Air Force Doctrine Document 2-10, 21 March 2006

Military units and formations established in 2006
Disaster preparedness in the United States
Bay County, Florida
Tyndall AFB